Diaphragmatic breathing, abdominal breathing, belly breathing, or deep breathing, is breathing that is done by contracting the diaphragm, a muscle located horizontally between the thoracic cavity and abdominal cavity. Air enters the lungs as the diaphragm strongly contracts, but unlike during traditional relaxed breathing (eupnea) the intercostal muscles of the chest do minimal work in this process. The belly also expands during this type of breathing to make room for the contraction of the diaphragm.

Explanation
According to the National Center for Complementary and Integrative Health, "12.7 percent of American adults [have] used deep-breathing exercises... for health purposes," which it describes as follows: "Deep breathing involves slow and deep inhalation through the nose, usually to a count of 10, followed by slow and complete exhalation for a similar count. The process may be repeated 5 to 10 times, several times a day."

According to the University of Texas Counseling and Mental Health Center, "Diaphragmatic breathing allows one to take normal breaths while maximizing the amount of oxygen that goes into the bloodstream. It is a way of interrupting the 'Fight or Flight' response and triggering the body's normal relaxation response."  They provide a video demonstration.

Diaphragmatic breathing has a physiological effect on the body by assisting in blood flow, lowering pulse rate and blood pressure "by improving vagal activity and reducing the sympathetic reaction."

In complementary and alternative medicine 

Some practitioners of complementary and alternative medicine believe that particular kinds of breathing they identify as diaphragm breathing can be used to bring about health benefits.

Deep breathing exercises are sometimes used as a form of relaxation, that, when practiced regularly, may lead to the relief or prevention of symptoms commonly associated with stress, which may include high blood pressure, headaches, stomach conditions, depression, anxiety, and others.

Due to the lung expansion being lower (inferior) on the body as opposed to higher up (superior), it is referred to as 'deep' and the higher lung expansion of rib cage breathing is referred to as 'shallow'. The actual volume of air taken into the lungs with either means varies.

Relation to yoga and meditation

Hatha Yoga, tai chi and meditation traditions draw a clear distinction between eupnea and diaphragmatic breathing or belly breathing. The more specific technique of diaphragmatic breathing is said to be more beneficial.

Fitness and wellness 
Some claim diaphragmatic breathing could provide a way to combat high stress, but clear evidence is yet to be shown.
The World Health Organization (WHO) states: "They should maintain a calm approach, where possible remove sources of anxiety and coach respirations (i.e. encourage normal breathing, not deeper and quicker than usual). 
... Acute stress should be managed using psychological first aid as per WHO (2010) mhGAP guidelines."
Following up in "Psychological first aid: Guide for field workers", published in 2011, the WHO states "Encourage the person to focus on their breathing, and to breathe slowly." Then although they instruct calming respiration as a response to stress, no instructions regarding diaphragmatic breathing are given.

Furthermore, there are those who claim diaphragmatic breathing may reduce the symptoms of irritable bowel syndrome (IBS), and menstrual cramps, but the research presented is lacking.
 
One should note that casual diaphragmatic breathing relies on other muscles used in thoracic breathing (such as the intercostal muscles), and that the diaphragm usually participates in healthy thoracic breathing, suggesting the speculated separation between the two isn't as neat as some would like to believe.

Finally, some pathologies, especially those affecting the elasticity or mobility of the chest or rib cage, would spell for an increase reliance or necessity for diaphragmatic activity during respiration.

Benefits
The use of diaphragmatic breathing is commonly practiced, especially in those patients with chronic obstructive pulmonary disease, to improve a variety of factors such as pulmonary function, cardiorespiratory fitness, respiratory muscle length, and respiratory muscle strength. Specifically, diaphragmatic breathing exercise is essential to asthmatics since breathing in these patients is of the thoracic type in association with decreased chest expansion and chest deformity as a result of a deformed sternum like pectus excavatum (funnel chest); a shortened diaphragm, intercostals and accessory muscles from prolonged spasm causing stenosis of the major airways leading to an abnormal respiratory pattern.

Relation to music
Diaphragmatic breathing is also widely considered essential for best possible singing performance. Diaphragmatic breathing also allows wind instrumentalists to maximise intake of air, minimising the number of breaths required for progressing players.

See also 
Breath
Buteyko method
Circular breathing
Kussmaul breathing
Pranayama – a traditional Yogic practice of slowing and extending the breaths, used during meditation
Shallow breathing – a type of breathing that is mutually exclusive to diaphragmatic breathing and is associated with multiple anxiety disorders
Wim Hof method

References
The link in Reference 5 is broken. I was unable to find the video on their website.

Additional Reading

External links 
 YouTube video that explains diaphragmatic breathing for singing. 
 Breathing Techniques for Better Health in 2023.

CAM therapy suggestions 
 Rapid deep breathing - hyperventilation

Respiration